The Fauvel AV.7 was a design for a twin-hull seaplane by Charles Fauvel in the early 1930s.

Design
The AV.7 was a three-engine flying boat project, with a twin-hull configuration similar to that of the Savoia-Marchetti seaplanes of Italy. Conceived in May 1932, it had three engines on top of the wing, and with a design range of ~. However, the AV.7 did not proceed beyond the drawing board. Likewise, a single-hull trimotor design, the AV.9, remained a paper project.

Specifications

References

Tailless aircraft
Flying wings
1930s French aircraft
Fauvel aircraft